Ostravik-Lindemann-Solberg syndrome, also known as heart defect-tongue hamartoma-polysyndactyly syndrome is a rare, multi-systemic genetic disorder which is characterized by congenital heart defects, tongue hamartomas, postaxial polydactyly of the hand, and syndactylism of the foot. This condition is thought to be caused by an autosomal dominant mutation in the WDPCP gene, in chromosome 2. Only 5 cases have been recorded in medical literature.

References 

Rare genetic syndromes
Congenital disorders